The Boeing 314 Clipper was an American long-range flying boat produced by Boeing from 1938 to 1941. One of the largest aircraft of its time, it had the range to cross the Atlantic and Pacific oceans. For its wing, Boeing re-used the design from the earlier XB-15 bomber prototype. Twelve Clippers were built, nine of which served with Pan Am.

Design and development

Pan American had requested a truly trans-Pacific flying boat with unprecedented range and double the passenger payload of the airline's Martin M-130. Boeing's bid was successful and on July 21, 1936, Pan American signed a contract for six. Boeing engineers adapted the cancelled XB-15's  wing, and replaced the  Pratt & Whitney Twin Wasp radial engines with the  Wright Twin Cyclone. Pan Am ordered six more aircraft with increased engine power and capacity for 77 daytime passengers as the Boeing 314A.

The huge flying boat was assembled at Boeing's Plant 1 on the Duwamish River in Seattle, and towed to Elliott Bay for taxi and flight tests. The first flight was on June 7, 1938, piloted by Edmund T. "Eddie" Allen. At first the aircraft had a single vertical tail, and Allen found he had inadequate directional control. The aircraft returned to the factory and was fitted with the endplates on the ends of the horizontal tail in place of the single vertical fin. This too was found to be insufficient and finally the centerline vertical fin was restored, after which the aircraft flew satisfactorily.

The 314 used a series of heavy ribs and spars to create a robust fuselage and cantilevered wing, eliminating the need for external drag-inducing struts to brace the wings. Boeing also incorporated Dornier-style sponsons into the hull structure. The sponsons, broad lateral extensions at the waterline on both sides of the hull, served several purposes: They provided a wide platform to stabilize the craft while floating, they acted as a gangway for boarding and exiting, and they possessed intentional shaping to contribute additional aerodynamic lift in flight.

To fly the long ranges needed for trans-Pacific service, the 314 carried  of gasoline. The later 314A model carried a further .

Pan Am's "Clippers" were built for "one-class" luxury air travel, a necessity given the long duration of transoceanic flights. Clipper service catered to elite businessmen and the wealthy traveler. The 314s had a lounge and dining area, and the galleys were crewed by chefs from four-star hotels. Men and women were provided with separate dressing rooms, and white-coated stewards served five and six-course meals with gleaming silver service. The standard of luxury on Pan American's Boeing 314s has rarely been matched on heavier-than-air transport since then. A round trip from New York to Southampton was $675, while a one-way ticket from San Francisco to Hong Kong via the "stepping-stone" islands posted at $760. The Pan Am Boeing 314 Clippers brought exotic destinations like the Far East within reach of air travelers and came to represent the romance of flight. Most of the flights were transpacific, while transatlantic flights to neutral Lisbon and Ireland continued after war broke out in Europe in September 1939 (and until 1945), but military passengers and cargoes necessarily got priority, and the service was more spartan.

Equally critical to the 314's success was the proficiency of its Pan Am flight crews, who were extremely skilled at long-distance, over-water flight operations and navigation. For training, many of the transpacific flights carried a second crew. Only the very best and most experienced flight crews were assigned Boeing 314 flying boat duty. Before coming aboard, all Pan Am captains as well as first and second officers had thousands of hours of flight time in other seaplanes and flying boats. Rigorous training in dead reckoning, timed turns, judging drift from sea current, celestial navigation, and radio navigation were conducted. In conditions of poor or no visibility, pilots sometimes made successful landings at fogged-in harbors by landing out to sea, then taxiing the 314 into port.

Operational history

The first 314 flight on the San Francisco-Hong Kong route left Alameda on February 23, 1939 with regular passenger and Foreign Air Mail Route #14 service beginning on March 29. A one-way trip on this route took over six days to complete. Commercial passenger service lasted less than three years, ending when the United States entered World War II in December 1941.  Passengers and their baggage were weighed, with each passenger allowed up to  free baggage allowance (in the later 314 series) but then charged  for exceeding the limit. 

The Yankee Clipper flew across the Atlantic on a route from Southampton to Port Washington, New York with intermediate stops at Foynes in Ireland, Botwood in Newfoundland, and Shediac, New Brunswick. The inaugural trip occurred on June 24, 1939.

The success of the six initial Clippers had led Pan Am to place an order for six improved 314A models to be delivered in 1941, with the goal of doubling the service on both Atlantic and Pacific routes. However, the fall of France in 1940 caused some doubt about whether the Atlantic service could continue; passenger numbers were already reduced by the war, and if Spain or Portugal were to join the Axis, then the flights to Lisbon would be forced to stop. Pan Am began to consider reducing its order and, in August 1940, reached an agreement to sell three of the six under construction to the United Kingdom. The aircraft were to be operated by the British Overseas Airways Corporation (BOAC) and were primarily intended for the UK – West Africa route, as existing flying boats could not travel this route without stopping in Lisbon. The sale made a small net profit for Pan Am – priced at cost plus 5% – and provided a vital communications link for Britain, but was politically controversial. In order to arrange the sale, the junior minister Harold Balfour had to agree to the contract with no government approval, leading to stern disapproval from Winston Churchill and lengthy debate by the Cabinet over the propriety of the purchase. Churchill later flew on the Bristol and Berwick, which he praised intensely, adding to the Clippers’ fame during the war.

At the outbreak of the war in the Pacific in December 1941, the Pacific Clipper was en route to New Zealand from San Francisco. Rather than risk flying back to Honolulu and being shot down by Japanese fighters, it was directed to fly west to New York. Starting on December 8, 1941 at Auckland, New Zealand, the Pacific Clipper covered over  via locations including Surabaya, Karachi, Bahrain, Khartoum and Leopoldville. The Pacific Clipper landed at Pan American's LaGuardia Field seaplane base at 7:12 on the morning of January 6, 1942. 

Pan Am's Clipper fleet was pressed into US military service during World War II, and the flying boats were used for ferrying personnel and equipment to the European and Pacific fronts. The aircraft were purchased by the War and Navy Departments and leased back to Pan Am for a dollar, with the understanding that all would be operated by the Navy once four-engined replacements for the Army's four Clippers were in service. Only the markings on the aircraft changed: The Clippers continued to be flown by their experienced Pan Am civilian crews. American military cargo was carried via Natal, Brazil to Liberia, to supply the British forces at Cairo and even the Russians, via the Persian Corridor. The Model 314 was then the only aircraft in the world that could make the  crossing over water. The Army gave the aircraft the designation C-98, but the Navy—which used a different designation system at the time—disregarded this designation and operated the aircraft under the company designation B-314. In February 1942, forty women were hired by Pan Am to replace male mechanics in the hangars at LaGuardia to perform service, repair and overhaul of the Clippers for the European service. Maintenance demands were such that it took "141 mechanics, working three 8-hour shifts, to perform in two days the complete inspection of servicing routine which must be carried out before a Clipper just in from Europe can be sent on the return trip." Since the Pan Am pilots and crews had extensive expertise in using flying boats for extreme long-distance over-water flights, the company's pilots and navigators continued to serve as flight crew. In 1943, President Franklin D. Roosevelt traveled to the Casablanca Conference in a Pan-Am crewed Boeing 314 Dixie Clipper.

After the war, several Clippers were returned to Pan American hands. However, even before hostilities had ended, the Clipper had become obsolete. The flying boat's advantage had been that it didn't require long concrete runways, but during the war a great many such runways had been built for heavy bombers. New long-range airliners such as the Lockheed Constellation and Douglas DC-4 were developed. The new landplanes were relatively easy to fly, and did not require the extensive pilot training programs mandated for seaplane operations. One of the 314's most experienced pilots said, "We were indeed glad to change to DC-4s, and I argued daily for eliminating all flying boats. The landplanes were much safer. No one in the operations department... had any idea of the hazards of flying boat operations. The main problem now was lack of the very high level of experience and competence required of seaplane pilots".

Retirement

The last Pan Am 314 to be retired, the California Clipper NC18602, in 1946, had accumulated more than a million flight miles. Of the 12 Boeing 314 Clippers built, three were lost to accidents, although only one of those resulted in fatalities: 24 passengers and crew aboard the Yankee Clipper NC18603 lost their lives in a landing accident at Cabo Ruivo Seaplane Base, in Lisbon, Portugal on February 22, 1943. Among that flight's passengers were prominent American author and war correspondent Benjamin Robertson, who was killed, and the American singer and actress Jane Froman, who was seriously injured.

Pan-Am's 314 was removed from scheduled service in 1946 and the seven serviceable B-314s were purchased by the start-up airline New World Airways. These sat at San Diego's Lindbergh Field for a long time before all were eventually sold for scrap in 1950. The last of the fleet, the Anzac Clipper NC18611(A), was resold and scrapped at Baltimore, Maryland in late 1951.

BOAC's 314As were withdrawn from the Baltimore-to-Bermuda route in January 1948, replaced by Lockheed Constellations flying from New York and Baltimore to Bermuda.

Variants
Model 314
Initial production version with  Twin Cyclone engines, six built for Pan Am.
Model 314A
Improved version with  Twin Cyclones with larger-diameter propellers, additional  fuel capacity, and revised interior. Still air range approx 4,700 miles. Six built, three for Pan Am and three sold to BOAC.
B-314
Five Model 314s pressed into military service with the U.S. Navy
C-98
Four Model 314s pressed into military service with the U.S. Army Air Forces

Operators

Pan American World Airways
United States Army Air Forces
United States Navy
World Airways

British Overseas Airways Corporation

Surviving aircraft

None of the dozen 314s built between 1939 and 1941 survived beyond 1951, with all 12 being cannibalized for parts, scuttled, scrapped, or otherwise written off. Underwater Admiralty Sciences, a non-profit oceanographic exploration and science research organization based in Kirkland, Washington, announced in 2005, at the 70th Anniversary of the first China Clipper flight in San Francisco, its plans to survey, photograph, and possibly recover the remains of the hulls of two sunken 314s: NC18601 (Honolulu Clipper), scuttled in the Pacific Ocean in 1945; and NC18612 (Bermuda Sky Queen, formerly Cape Town Clipper), sunk in the Atlantic by the Coast Guard in 1947.  UAS has also spent significant time at Pan Am reunions and with individual crewmembers and employees of Pan Am conducting videotaped interviews for the mission's companion documentary. However, as of 2014, no search or recovery had been attempted, with the most recent news from 2011 suggesting that the company was still in need of at least US$8 million to get the plan under way.

There is a life-size 314 mockup at the Foynes Flying Boat Museum, Foynes, County Limerick, Ireland, located on the site of the original transatlantic flying-boat terminus.

Specifications (314A Clipper)

See also

References

Notes

Sources

 
 
 
 
 
 Dover, Ed. The Long Way Home: A Journey into History with Captain Robert Ford.  Albuquerque, New Mexico: Amazon POD,  Revised Edition 2010, First edition 2008. .

External links

 Boeing: Historical Snapshot: Model 314 Clipper Flying Boat
 The Boeing 314
 Pan American Clippers 1931–1946
 Boeing 314
 Boeing 314
 Boeing 314 
 LIFE colour photo camouflaged Clipper La Guardia Marine Terminal ca.1942
 LIFE photo essay (comprehensive)'Pan American Clipper Ship' includes NC18605 in a glass doored hangar 1940
 LIFE photo Pan Am skipper flying the 314
 LIFE photo essay 'Pan American Clipper'includes Eve Curie leading pax off Clipper at Lisbon 1940
   LIFE photos NC18602 in Singapore Harbour 1941
 China Clipper 75th Anniversary Commemorative Flight (November 2010 – San Francisco Aeronautical Society)
 "Two Day Turn Around", February 1941 article
 "Three Deck Clipper Has Aisle In Wings", Popular Mechanics, August 1937, early article on Pan American Airways new airliner for trans-ocean flight
 "New York To Europe By Clipper",  Popular MechanicsMay 1939, large article with cutaway drawing of interior
  "Sailors of the Sky", Popular Mechanics, December 1940, detailed article with photos on flight deck operations of the Boeing 314

314
1930s United States airliners
Flying boats
Four-engined tractor aircraft
High-wing aircraft
Pan Am
Aircraft first flown in 1938
Four-engined piston aircraft